Atybe is a genus of longhorn beetles of the subfamily Lamiinae, containing the following species:

 Atybe nyassensis Breuning, 1970
 Atybe plantii Pascoe, 1864

References

Pteropliini
Cerambycidae genera